Redmund Geach (12 April 1933 – 15 April 1986) was a South African cricketer. He played in forty first-class matches from 1953/54 to 1961/62.

References

External links
 

1933 births
1986 deaths
South African cricketers
Border cricketers
Northerns cricketers
Cricketers from Bloemfontein